Lachowski is a surname. Notable people with the surname include:

Francisco Lachowski (born 1991), Brazilian model
Michael Lachowski, American musician
Sławomir Lachowski (born 1958), Polish banker

Polish-language surnames